Monte Scheinblum (born May 15, 1967) is an American professional golfer, and the son of former Major League Baseball All Star outfielder Richie Scheinblum. While he competed on the Nike Tour, he became known especially for his long driving, where success is achieved by a golfer hitting a golf ball the farthest. In 1992 he won the National Long Driving Championship in the United States, and was the world long driving champion.

Early life
Scheinblum, who is Jewish, is the son of former Major League Baseball All Star outfielder Richie Scheinblum.  His father played in the 1972 All Star Game while he was with the Kansas City Royals.

As a child, he spent two years of his boyhood in Japan, where his father played baseball for the Hiroshima Carp. He then lived in Orange County, California, where he attended Villa Park High School. Scheinblum turned to professional golf after an injury to his pitching elbow in his freshman year of being a power pitcher in high school ended his dream of playing major league baseball as his father had.

Golf
A 6' 2", 235-pound athlete, Scheinblum is an accomplished golfer. Between 1993 and 1996 he competed on the second tier Nike Tour (now Korn Ferry Tour), where his best finish was a tie for fifth in the 1994 Monterrey Open. He also played in one PGA Tour event, the 1996 Michelob Championship at Kingsmill, missing the cut.

Scheinblum has had his greatest success in long drive competitions. In 1991, he was the runner-up in the U.S. National Long Driving Championship with a drive of 319 yards. The following year, in Boca Raton, Florida, he won the event with a drive of 329 yards, 13 inches, into a 20 mile-per-hour wind. Mike Gorton, the 1987 champion, took second with a drive of 307 yards, 22 inches. That year he was also the world long driving champion. In October 1993, he narrowly failed to defend his national title, finishing second to Brian Pavlett with a drive of 324 yards, 30 inches. Pavlett had hit his first three balls out of bounds before going past Scheinblum with a drive of 336 yards, 6 inches.

See also
List of Jewish golfers

References

External links
Monte Scheinblum website

"Scheinblum Thinks Nike Players are Above Par", Philadelphia Daily News,  June 12, 1995

American male golfers
UCLA Bruins men's golfers
PGA Tour golfers
American long drive golfers
Jewish golfers
Golfers from Portland, Oregon
Golfers from California
Jewish American sportspeople
Sportspeople from Orange County, California
Sportspeople from Riverside County, California
1967 births
Living people
21st-century American Jews